Boheman is a Swedish surname.

Prevalence
Outside of Sweden, the surname is also prevalent in the United States.

Origin

The surname originates from the name of a burguess from Jönköping.

Notable people
Notable people with this surname include:
 Carl Adolf Boheman (1764-1831), Swedish mystic
 Carl Henrik Boheman (1796-1868), Swedish entomologist
 Erik Boheman (1895-1979), Swedish diplomat

References